Sidonie Matsner Gruenberg (1881–1974) was a parenting expert, writer, and director of the Child Study Association of America.

In her 1912 book Your Child Today and Tomorrow, Gruenberg popularized the idea of giving an allowance to children so they could understand how to spend it.

Life
Sidonie Gruenberg was born in Austria and educated in Germany and New York City. She married Benjamin Gruenberg, a biology teacher, in 1903, and had four children between 1907–1915: Herbert, Richard, Hilda, and Ernest.

In her parenting books, she said that children do not have any moral actions, so parents should permit actions to help them grow in their individual expression. 
Gruenberg rejected what she saw as "arbitrary puritanism" in American parenting, saying that strict parents suggest "every desire and impulse of being Satanic." 
On behalf of Macy's, she lectured at an exposition on "why children should have toys" in 1928.

References

External links
 
 Sidonie Gruenberg in Notable American Women

1881 births
1974 deaths
American family and parenting writers
20th-century American non-fiction writers
20th-century American women writers
American women non-fiction writers